Space Delta 10 (DEL 10) is a United States Space Force unit responsible for space doctrine and wargaming. It was established on 23 August 2021 following the establishment of the Space Training and Readiness Command, the field command to which it reports. It is temporarily headquartered at the United States Air Force Academy, Colorado, but its final location requires a base selection process.

A ceremony was held on 30 September 2021 to recognize the delta's activation and the activation of the 10th Delta Operations Squadron.

Structure 
DEL 10 is one of five deltas that reports to the Space Training and Readiness Command. It will be composed of four subordinate units, including the following squadron. It plans to add the 10th Doctrine and Tactics Squadron and 10th Wargaming Squadron.

List of commanders

References

External links 

 Fact Sheet

Deltas of the United States Space Force